Local elections were held in Montenegro in March and October 2022 in 13 municipalities and early elections in 2 municipalities.

In June 2021, President of the Parliament of Montenegro Aleksa Bečić started the initiative for organizing local elections in 17 or 18 municipalities in the same day in 2022.

President of Montenegro, Milo Đukanović, set elections for 26 January 2022 in Berane and for 27 March Ulcinj. On 4 February Montenegro Parliament changed the law for elections in municipalities with the goal that all elections are going to be held on one day, but president Milo Đukanović did not support this change.

President Đukanović set early elections in Tivat and Budva as well as regular elections: in Žabljak and Plužine for 5 June; 
elections in Bijelo Polje and Šavnik for 12 June; and elections in Bar, Danilovgrad, Kolašin and Podgorica for 19 June.

After the new governing majority (DPS, URA, BS, SD and SNP) was formed, they gave initiative to shift elections in 14 municipalities for 23 October.

Results

March elections

Berane

Ulcinj

October elections

Budva

Tivat

Plužine

Žabljak

Bijelo Polje

Šavnik

Bar

Danilovgrad

Kolašin

Podgorica

Plav

Pljevlja

Rožaje

Zeta

List of mayors and local governments

References

Montenegro
Municipal
Montenegro
Montenegro
Local elections in Montenegro